Andrey Parfenov (born 17 December 1987) is a Russian cross-country skier who competes internationally with the Russian national team.

He made his World Cup debut in 2007, and competed at the FIS Nordic World Ski Championships 2015.

Cross-country skiing results
All results are sourced from the International Ski Federation (FIS).

World Championships

World Cup

Season standings

Individual podiums
2 podiums – (2 )

Team podiums

 1 victory – (1 ) 
 1 podiums – (1 )

References

External links

1987 births
Living people
People from Troitsko-Pechorsky District
Russian male cross-country skiers
Sportspeople from the Komi Republic